Paul James Harwood (born 16 February 1977) is a former English cricketer.  Harwood was a left-handed batsman who bowled right-arm fast-medium.  He was born in King's Lynn, Norfolk.

Harwood made his debut for Norfolk in the 1994 Minor Counties Championship against Suffolk.  Harwood played Minor counties cricket for Norfolk from 1994 to 1998, which included 2 Minor Counties Championship matches and 4 MCCA Knockout Trophy matches.   He made his only List A appearance against Durham in the 1998 NatWest Trophy.  In this match, he scored a single run before being dismissed by Nick Phillips.

References

External links
Paul Harwood at ESPNcricinfo
Paul Harwood at CricketArchive

1977 births
Living people
Cricketers from King's Lynn
English cricketers
Norfolk cricketers